The Waif and the Wizard, also entitled The Home Made Happy, is a 1901 British short  silent comedy film, directed by Walter R. Booth, featuring a magician using his magic to aid an ailing girl at the request of her brother. The film, "is rather less elaborate in terms of special effects than the other films that W.R. Booth and R.W. Paul made the same year," but according to Michael Brooke of BFI Screenonline, "provides an excellent illustration of how effects used sparingly can often have more impact, especially when set in a suitable emotional context."

References

External links

1901 films
British black-and-white films
British silent short films
1901 comedy films
1901 short films
Articles containing video clips
British comedy short films
Films directed by Walter R. Booth
Silent comedy films